Interleukin-1 family member 10 is a protein that in humans is encoded by the IL1F10 gene.

The protein encoded by this gene is a member of the interleukin 1 cytokine family. This gene and eight other interleukin 1 family genes form a cytokine gene cluster on chromosome 2. This cytokine is thought to participate in a network of interleukin 1 family members to regulate adapted and innate immune responses. Two alternatively spliced transcript variants encoding the same protein have been reported.

References

Further reading